The Winston-Salem Polar Twins were a minor league professional ice hockey team from Winston-Salem, North Carolina. The Polar Twins were launched in the 2004–05 season of the Southern Professional Hockey League, playing home games at the LJVM Coliseum Annex. The Polar Twins folded after the inaugural season.

References

Defunct Southern Professional Hockey League teams
Ice hockey clubs established in 2004
Sports clubs disestablished in 2005
Ice hockey teams in North Carolina
Sports in Winston-Salem, North Carolina
2004 establishments in North Carolina
2005 disestablishments in North Carolina